The freezing level, or 0 °C (zero-degree) isotherm, represents the altitude in which the temperature is at 0 °C (the freezing point of water) in a free atmosphere (i.e. allowing reflection of the sun by snow, icing conditions, etc.). Any given measure is valid for only a short period of time, often less than a day as variations in wind, sunlight, air masses and other factors may change the level.

Above the freezing altitude, the temperature of the air is below freezing. Below it, the temperature is above freezing. The profile of this frontier, and its variations, are studied in meteorology, and are used for a variety of forecasts and predictions, especially in cold weather. Whilst not given on general weather forecasts, it is used on bulletins giving forecasts for mountainous areas.

Measuring

There are several different methods to examine the structure of the temperature of the atmosphere including its freezing level:
A radiosonde attached to a weather balloon is the oldest and most common method used. Each area normally releases two balloons a day in locations hundreds of kilometers apart.
Measuring devices attached to commercial airliners permit reporting the isotherm, and its height from sea level, to aerial traffic.
Weather satellites are equipped with sensors that scan the atmosphere and measure the infrared radiation it emits indicating its temperature.
Weather radar detects bright bands, which are radar echoes produced just underneath and within the isotherm caused by the melting of snow or ice in the layer below that's above 0 °C.
A wind profiler, an upward pointing radar, can detect the speed of precipitation, which is different for rain, snow, slush and melting snow.

Depending on the frequency and resolution at which these readings are taken, these methods can report the isotherm with greater or lesser precision.  Radiosondes, for example, only report a reading twice daily and provide very rough information.  Weather radar can detect a variation every five to ten minutes if there is precipitation, and can scan a radius of up to two kilometers.

Variations in the isotherm

The isotherm can be very stable over a large area.  It varies under two major conditions:
A change in the density of air due to weather fronts. This changes the isotherm gradually, over tens of kilometres for a cold front, and hundreds for a warm front, but the change spreads over a large area.
Local levels can be changed by wind, reflection of the sun, snow, and humidity level. These factors can cause the isotherm to change rapidly and sometimes constantly over several kilometres, in both winter and summer all year round. Also, atmospheric subsidence and ascendence can contribute to variations in the isotherm.
These conditions imply that the 0 °C isotherm varies globally and more so locally.

See also
 Temperature inversion
 Lapse rate

References
 The Mountain Manual, Seuil, 2000

Mountains
Montane ecology
Meteorological phenomena